Arnold zum Turm  (de turri or of the tower, died c. 1266) was city chancellor to the bishop of Mainz from 1238 until at least 15 October 1263 – his son Eberhard took over that office in 1266 and so Arnold is believed to have died that year. 

He is also notable as the co-founder (with Arnold Walpold) of the Rhine City League and as such is commemorated in the Walhalla temple.

Sources 
 Walhalla, Amtlicher Führer (Official guidebook), 2006

13th-century births
1266 deaths